The 2016–17 VMI Keydets basketball team represented the Virginia Military Institute in the 2016–17 NCAA Division I men's basketball season. The Keydets were led by second-year head coach Dan Earl and played their home games out of Cameron Hall in Lexington, Virginia, their home since 1981. The Keydets played as a member of the Southern Conference. They finished the season 6–24, 3–15 in SoCon play to finish in last place. They lost in the first round of the SoCon tournament to Samford.

Previous season
The Keydets finished the 2015–16 season with an overall record 9–21, and a 4–14 mark in SoCon play to finish in a tie for eighth place. They lost in the first round of the SoCon tournament to Samford.

Preseason

Departures
VMI lost only three seniors from the previous season.

Recruiting

Roster

Depth chart

Schedule and results

|-
!colspan=9 style=| Non-conference regular season

|-
!colspan=9 style=| SoCon regular season

|-
!colspan=9 style=| SoCon tournament

References

VMI Keydets basketball seasons
VMI
VMI Keydets bask
VMI Keydets bask